Ulysses Prentiss Hedrick (1870–1951) was an American botanist
and horticulturist.

His main interest was cultivated fruit trees and he published a number of volumes dealing with such fruits as cherries, grapes, plums, and peaches.

Biography 
Hedrick was born in 1870 in Independence, Iowa. He grew up in Northern Michigan near Harbor Springs, an experience recalled in his memoir The Land of the Crooked Tree, and was the brother of Wilbur Olin Hedrick. He attended Michigan State Agricultural College (MSAC), now Michigan State University, receiving a Bachelor of Science degree in 1893 and a Master of Science degree in 1895.  He worked as Assistant Horticulturist at MSAC from 1893 to 1895, while studying for his M.S.

From 1895 to 1905, Hedrick taught botany and horticulture at Oregon Agricultural College (1895–1897), Utah Agricultural College (1897–1899), and Michigan State Agricultural College (1899–1905).  He became a horticulturist at the New York State Agricultural Experiment Station in Geneva, New York in 1905.  While in Geneva, Hedrick was awarded an honorary Doctor of Science (Sc.D.) degree at Hobart College in 1913.  He continued to work at the Station, which he directed from 1928 onwards, until 1937, when he retired.

Hedrick was made a Fellow of the American Association for the Advancement of Science in 1911, and of the New York State Historical Association and a member of the American Society for Horticultural Science (president 1913) and American Pomological Society.

During his lifetime, he authored or co-authored more than a dozen publications, which are "still frequently consulted", on the subjects of pomology and horticulture.  His monographs on fruits, including publications such as The Pears of New York (1922), "have become classic references on the fruit cultivars of the period".

Hedrick died in 1951.

Publications 

 Grapes of New York (1908)
 Plums of New York (1911)
 Cherries of New York (1915)
 Peaches of New York (1917)
 Manual of American Grape Growing (1919)
 Sturtevant's Notes on Edible Plants (1919)
 Cyclopedia of Hardy Fruits (1921)
 The Pears of New York (1921)
 Systematic Pomology (1925)
 Small Fruit of New York (1925)
 The Vegetables of New York (1929)
 History of Agriculture in the State of New York (1933)
 Fruits for the Home Garden (1944)
 The Land of the Crooked Tree (1948)
 Grapes and Wines from Home Vineyards (1945)
 A History of Horticulture in America (1950)

References

External links 

 
 

Botanists with author abbreviations
1870 births
1951 deaths
American botanists
Botanists active in North America
Hobart and William Smith Colleges alumni
Michigan State University alumni
Michigan State University faculty
Oregon State University faculty
Pomologists
Utah State University faculty
American horticulturists
People from Independence, Iowa